Isaura Menin (born 1 June 1994) is a Brazilian handballer for Rincón Fertilidad Málaga and the Brazilian national team.

Clubs Titles
Liga Nacional de Handebol Feminino 2018: UnC Concórdia

References

External links

1994 births
Living people
Brazilian expatriate sportspeople in Spain
Brazilian female handball players
People from Concórdia, Santa Catarina
Sportspeople from Santa Catarina (state)
21st-century Brazilian women